Lists of ambassadors of Austria may refer to:
List of ambassadors of Austria to Peru
List of ambassadors of Austria to South Korea
List of ambassadors of Austria to the United States
List of ambassadors of Austria-Hungary to the United Kingdom

See also 
List of ambassadors to Austria
List of ambassadors

 
Lists of ambassadors by country of origin